Li Ning is a Chinese gymnast and entrepreneur.
 Li-Ning, the sportswear company founded by him

Li Ning or Ning Li may also refer to:

 Li Ning (Tang dynasty) (793–812), Tang prince
 Li Ning (engineer) (born 1958), Chinese petroleum engineer
 Ning Li (physicist), Chinese-American physicist
 Li Ning (baseball) (born 1994), Chinese baseball player

See also
 Lining (disambiguation)